The Aveluy Communal Cemetery Extension is a cemetery located in the Somme region of France commemorating French and British Commonwealth troops who fought in the Battle of the Somme in World War I. The cemetery honors mainly soldiers who died holding the line near the village of Aveluy from slightly before July 1915 to 26 March 1918.

Location 
The cemetery is located just off of the D20 road in the village of Aveluy, which is itself a short distance north of Albert, France.

Fighting near Aveluy 
The front near Aveluy was held by the French until August 1915, until it was transferred into Commonwealth control. The British held the line until 27 March 1918, when the Germans overran Aveluy in their final Offensive on the Somme. The village was retaken by the British in August 1918.

Establishment

History 
The cemetery was begun by the French and was transferred into Commonwealth jurisdiction along with the rest of the line. It was used by fighting units and field ambulances, most notably the 3rd and 9th Casualty Clearing Stations, who used the cemetery until November 1917. The cemetery extension was designed by Sir Reginald Blomfield.

Statistics 
The cemetery contains a total of 613 graves, with 589 of them identified and 26 unidentified. 3 memorials commemorate graves that could not be located from their original burial site.

References 

World War I cemeteries in France